St. Paul's Co-Cathedral is a parish of the Roman Catholic Church in Saskatoon, Saskatchewan, Canada, and mother church and co-cathedral of the Diocese of Saskatoon.

The Co-Cathedral is located in the city's Central Business District at the corner of 22nd Street East and Spadina Crescent, on the west bank of the South Saskatchewan River. The cornerstone of St. Paul's was laid on July 25, 1910, by Canadian Prime Minister Sir Wilfrid Laurier and a year later it was formally consecrated by Archbishop Adelard Langevin of St. Boniface, Manitoba.  Originally built as parish church, it became a pro-cathedral in 1921, and elevated to a full cathedral in 1934 when the Diocese of Saskatoon was established. The Casavant organ was installed in 1912.

The Institute for Stained Glass in Canada has documented the stained glass at St Paul's Cathedral. The stained glass was added in 1945 to commemorate those who lost their lives in World War II and in 1976 for those that lost their lives to a fire.

Due to its small size and lack of space to expand, the building had been unable to effectively function as a cathedral since the mid-1990s. On December 18, 2011, the new Holy Family Cathedral was opened, and St. Paul's became a co-cathedral and continued to function as a local parish.

In 2019, two paintings of Sts. Peter and Paul by German religious artist Berthold Imhoff were acquired from the church of St. Andrew's in Blaine Lake, which was being decommissioned. Unveiled on June 29, the feast of Sts. Peter and Paul, they remain on display in the sanctuary.

References

External link
 

Roman Catholic cathedrals in Saskatchewan
Churches in Saskatoon
Roman Catholic churches completed in 1911
Roman Catholic churches in Saskatchewan
20th-century Roman Catholic church buildings in Canada
Christian organizations established in 1910